Beeby Peak is a peak  east-northeast of the summit of Mount Bird in northwest Ross Island, that rises to about . It was named by the New Zealand Geographic Board in 2000 after Chris Beeby.

References 

Mountains of Ross Island